Aquita is a genus of moths in the family Nolidae.

Species
 Aquita acontioides (Walker, 1862)
 Aquita capnodes (Wileman and West, 1928)
 Aquita ectrocta (Hampson, 1907)
 Aquita grisea (Hampson, 1914)
 Aquita hemiphaea (Hampson, 1905)
 Aquita laminata (Hampson, 1891) (syn: Aquita rufescens (Hampson, 1894))
 Aquita leucobaeta (Wileman and West, 1928)
 Aquita plagiochyta (Turner, 1944)
 Aquita scoparialis (Wileman and West, 1928)
 Aquita seria Holloway, 2003
 Aquita tactalis (Walker, 1863) (syn: Aquita horridella Walker, 1863)

Aquita lunisigna (Hampson, 1898) is now known as Barasa lunisigna.

References

  (1989). Lepidopterorum Catalogus (New Series) Fascicle 118, Noctuidae. CRC Press. , .

External links
Aquita at funet
 

Nolinae